The 1932 Cork Intermediate Hurling Championship was the 23rd staging of the Cork Intermediate Hurling Championship since its establishment by the Cork County Board in 1909.

Ballinora won the championship following a 2-05 to 1-03 defeat of Buttevant in the final. This was their first championship title in the grade.

Results

Final

References

Cork Intermediate Hurling Championship
Cork Intermediate Hurling Championship